Nandu is a 1981 Indian Tamil-language film written and directed by Mahendran. The film stars Suresh and Ashwini. It is based on the 1975 novel of the same name by Sivasankari. The film was released on 17 April 1981 and failed commercially.

Plot 

Ramkumar Sharma is a sickly engineer living in Lucknow in a large family. He suffers from asthma and does not like the behaviour of his autocratic father, but is deeply attached to his loving mother. Unable to get along with his father who compels him to marry a girl of his choice, Sharma leaves for Madras. He finds a job there and meets Seetha. Once settled, he goes around looking for a house with the help of house broker. Incidentally, he finds Seetha residing as a tenant in a portion under the very same house. He likes the portion and agrees to start living there. The lives of the girls who live in portions of the large house are brightened by the appearance of the engineer from Lucknow. Of them, two of them try to impress Sharma. One of them is the house owner's daughter, while the other is Seetha. Eventually, he ends up marrying Seetha.

Cast 
 Suresh as Ramkumar Sharma
 Ashwini as Seetha
 Vennira Aadai Moorthy as Singa Muth
 Vanitha Krishnachandran as Uma
 Kutty Padmini as Lakshmi
Senthamarai
Samikannu as Arunachalam
S. N. Parvathy as Uma's mother
 Kumarimuthu as the house broker

Production 
Nandu is based on the 1975 novel of the same name by Sivasankari. Suhasini, who previously appeared in Mahendran's Nenjathai Killathe (1980), worked as an assistant cinematographer under Ashok Kumar. The film took liberties with the novel; while the protagonist in the novel is a cancer patient, the disease was changed to asthma for the film.

Themes 
Writing for Frontline, Venkatesh Chakravarthy believes the title Nandu is a metaphor used as a "double-edged weapon in the film".

Soundtrack 
The soundtrack was composed by Ilaiyaraaja. The songs "Kaise Kahoon" and "Hum Hai Akele" are entirely in Hindi. The song "Manjal Veyil" is set in the Carnatic raga Kalyani.

Release and reception 
Nandu was released on 17 April 1981. The posters were designed with a crab's shadow looming over the protagonist to indicate his eventual death. Kumudam noted the film's abundance of Hindi dialogues, and caustically commented that any more dialogues in Hindi would result in K. Balaji (a film producer known mainly for remaking Hindi films in Tamil) remaking the film in Tamil. Jeeva of Kalki appreciated the comedy by Mahendran's usual team of Kumarimuthu, Vennira Aadai Moorthy and Samikannu, the cinematography by Ashok Kumar, Ilaiyaraaja's music, and concluded that the film was a must watch for Mahendran's filmmaking prowess. The film failed commercially, with Maalai Malar attributing it to the audience's inability to understand the many Hindi dialogues.

References

External links 
 

1980s Tamil-language films
1981 films
Films based on Indian novels
Films directed by Mahendran (filmmaker)
Films scored by Ilaiyaraaja
Films set in Uttar Pradesh
Films with screenplays by Mahendran (filmmaker)